Merdingen is a municipality in the district of Breisgau-Hochschwarzwald in Baden-Württemberg in Germany. Merdingen's main industry are vineyards. Jan Ullrich was a notable resident until 2002.

References

Breisgau-Hochschwarzwald
Baden